Melanaema sanguinea is a moth in the family Erebidae. It was described by George Hampson in 1900. It is found on New Guinea and on Fergusson Island.

References

Moths described in 1900
Nudariina